Against the Norm is a short 30 minute comedy film, written and directed by British pharmacist and screenwriter, Iqbal Mohammed.

Plot

The story is about 3 college students, Tanny (Deven Modha), an Asian male who acts stereotypically white, Nathan (Ian John Baptiste) a black male who acts stereotypically Asian and Eric (Samuel Bass) a white male who acts stereotypically black. All three of them are called up to the Principal's (Tony Goodall) office and accused of cheating in their General Studies mock exam for writing exactly the same phrase, "Against the Norm." After being scolded by the principal, Eric takes Tanny's radio which is then taken by "Weasel" (Aurie James). The 3 students then have to join forces to form a dance group called the "Rainbow Crew" to have a dance off to win the radio back. After winning the radio back, Eric then apologises to the other two for the way he behaved earlier on and the three become friends.

The film was shortlisted for the PAGE International Screenwriting Awards and is set to be shown at Cannes this summer.

Cast

 Tanny - Deven Modha
 Nathan - Ian John Baptiste
 Eric - Samuel Bass
 Mr Brown - Tony Goodall
 Weasel - Aurie James
 Director - Iqbal Mohammed
 Producer - Louise Morton Murray

External links
 https://www.youtube.com/watch?v=7qkWPHcZ_2g - Against the Norm film trailer on YouTube
 http://www.dynamiqfilms.com/

British comedy short films